Kai Ching Estate is a public housing estate in a brownfield development area in Hong Kong of the disused Kai Tak Airport. It consists of six residential buildings completed in 2013. It houses around 5,200 flats for 13,300 residents and shares the "Ching Long Shopping Centre" with Tak Long Estate. Kai Ching Estate was built by China State Construction Engineering (Hong Kong).

History 
In 1998, the Kai Tak Airport relocated to Chek Lap Kok as Hong Kong International Airport, clearing the way for a redevelopment of the Kai Tak lands. In 2006, the Planning Department outlined plans to build two new public estates on part of this brownfield site. The two estates, called Kai Ching (啟晴) and Tak Long (德朗), opened on the former north apron in 2013/2014.
Like other public housing estates in Hong Kong, the construction of Kai Ching Estate made use of prefabricated components including precast facades and staircases, semi-precast slabs, and precast kitchens and bathrooms. Kai Ching was also a pilot estate for the use of precast water taps.

The estate incorporates a number of energy and water saving features. Renewable energy sources include solar panels on the housing block rooftops, and lift motors that can generate power when the lift is carrying a heavy load down, a light load up, or under braking conditions. A district cooling system cools non-domestic facilities including the shops, kindergartens, and estate offices. A rainwater collection system is used for irrigation.

Houses

Demographics
According to the 2016 by-census, Kai Ching Estate had a population of 11,881. The median age was 44.3 and the majority of residents (98.5 per cent) were of Chinese ethnicity. The average household comprised 2.3 persons. The median monthly household income of all households (i.e. including both economically active and inactive households) was HK$14,010.

Education
Kai Ching Estate is in Primary One Admission (POA) School Net 34. Within the school net are multiple aided schools (operated independently but funded with government money) and two government schools: Farm Road Government Primary School and Ma Tau Chung Government Primary School.

Incidents

2014 shooting 
The estate dominated television news for some days in early June 2014 after resident Li Tak-yan shot and killed Liu Kai-chung, another resident of Lok Ching House. The murder sparked a 12-hour standoff with police as Li hid in his 10th storey flat. Amid exchanges of gunfire the police fired tear gas and stun grenades into the flat. The gunman shot and killed himself. Li, a Mainland immigrant and father of actress Liddy Li, had previously been jailed for attacking a neighbour with a chopper and hammer. Media reported that Li had other guns and ammunition at home.

Contamination of potable water 

In 2015 water samples from Kai Ching Estate were found to be contaminated with lead, sparking a citywide scandal and the discovery of contaminated drinking water at many other buildings. Pipe soldering samples taken from Kai Ching Estate contained 50 per cent lead.

Legionellosis 
The government announced on 13 July 2015 that a man suffering from a chronic illness had been admitted to intensive care on 28 May. The water supply at the home of the 72-year-old resident of Mun Ching House had tested positive for Legionella bacteria. The news has created fear and uncertainty among residents, who complained at the long time the authorities took to make the investigation public. The lack of transparency of government was deplored by pro-establishment and pro-democracy politicians alike.

References 

Public housing estates in Hong Kong
Kai Tak Development